The 1947 Vermont Catamounts football team was an American football team that represented the University of Vermont as a member of the Yankee Conference during the 1947 college football season. In its fifth season under head coach John C. Evans, the team compiled a 3–4–1 record (0–1–1 against conference opponents) and finished in a tie for last place in the Yankee Conference. The team played its home games at Centennial Field in Burlington, Vermont.

Schedule

References

Vermont
Vermont Catamounts football seasons
Vermont Catamounts football